Eustalodes achrasella, the sapota bud borer, is a moth in the family Gelechiidae. It was described by John David Bradley in 1981. It is found in Pakistan and northern India.

The length of the forewings is 9.8-12.4 mm for males and 10.4-12.8 mm for females. The forewings are dark ashy grey and the hindwings are yellowish.

The larvae feed on Achras sapota. They damage the inflorescence of their host plant, preferring to feed on set fruits rather than buds, flowers or immature fruits.

References

Chelariini
Moths described in 1981